Joseph Murdock or Murdoch may refer to:

Joseph B. Murdock (1851–1931), United States Navy rear admiral
Joseph Royal Murdock (1858–?), American politician from Utah
Joseph S. Murdock (1822–1899), American colonizer, leader, and Mormon hymn writer
Joseph Murdoch (mineralogist) (1890–1973), American, see Murdochite

See also
Joe Murdoch (1908–2002), Australian rules footballer